The 12th Toronto International Film Festival (TIFF) took place in Toronto, Ontario, Canada between September 10 and September 19, 1987. I've Heard the Mermaids Singing by Patricia Rozema was selected as the opening film.

The Princess Bride by Rob Reiner won the People's Choice Award at the festival. André the Giant, one of the stars of the film, sat on a girth constructed especially for him during the premiere of the film at the festival.

Awards

Programme

Galas
Aria — Robert Altman, Bruce Beresford, Bill Bryden, Jean-Luc Godard, Derek Jarman, Franc Roddam, Nicolas Roeg, Ken Russell, Charles Sturridge and Julien Temple
Boyfriends and Girlfriends (L'Ami de mon amie) — Eric Rohmer
Dark Eyes — Nikita Mikhalkov
The Glass Menagerie — Paul Newman
I've Heard the Mermaids Singing — Patricia Rozema
Night Zoo (Un zoo la nuit) — Jean-Claude Lauzon
Orphans — Alan J. Pakula
The Princess Bride — Rob Reiner
Sammy and Rosie Get Laid — Stephen Frears
Too Outrageous! — Richard Benner

Special Presentations
Baby Boom — Charles Shyer
Hail! Hail! Rock 'n' Roll — Taylor Hackford
Sister, Sister — Bill Condon
The Thief of Baghdad — Raoul Walsh

Contemporary World Cinema
Babette's Feast — Gabriel Axel
Barfly — Barbet Schroeder
The Belly of an Architect — Peter Greenaway
Big Shots — Robert Mandel
Comrades — Bill Douglas
A Death in the Family — Stewart Main and Peter Wells
Diary for My Lovers (Napló szerelmeimnek) — Márta Mészáros
Dudes — Penelope Spheeris
Dust in the Wind — Hou Hsiao-hsien
Field of Honor (Champ d'honneur) — Jean-Pierre Denis
Five Corners — Tony Bill
A Flame in My Heart (Une flamme dans mon cœur) — Alain Tanner
Gaby: A True Story — Luis Mandoki
Good Morning, Babylon (Buongiorno Babilonia) — Paolo and Vittorio Taviani
Half of Heaven (La mitad del cielo) — Manuel Gutiérrez Aragón
Jean de Florette — Claude Berri
Julia and Julia (Giulia e Giulia) — Peter Del MonteKeep Your Right Up (Soigne ta droite) — Jean-Luc GodardKing Lear — Jean-Luc GodardMagdalena Viraga — Nina Menkes Matewan — John SaylesMaurice — James IvoryMauvais Sang — Leos CaraxNear Dark — Kathryn BigelowNight of the Pencils (La noche de los lápices) — Héctor OliveraParadise — Doris DörriePersonal Services — Terry JonesA Prayer for the Dying — Mike HodgesRepentance — Tengiz AbuladzeSlam Dance — Wayne WangSorceress — Susan SchiffmanSouth of Reno — Mark RezykaA Successful Man (Un hombre de éxito) — Humberto SolásA Taxing Woman — Juzo ItamiThe Theme (Tema) — Gleb PanfilovTough Guys Don't Dance — Norman MailerTravelling avant — Jean-Charles TacchellaUnder the Sun of Satan (Sous le soleil de Satan) — Maurice PialatWish You Were Here — David Leland

Perspectives CanadaAnd Then You Die — Francis MankiewiczCandy Mountain — Robert Frank and Rudy WurlitzerThe Climb — Don ShebibThe Critical Years — Gerald L'EcuyerDeaf to the City (Le sourd dans la ville) — Mireille DansereauEva: Guerrillera — Jacqueline LevitinFamily Viewing — Atom EgoyanIn the Shadow of the Wind (Les fous de Bassan) — Yves SimoneauJuju Music — Jacques HolenderThe Last Straw — Giles WalkerLife Classes — William D. MacGillivrayLe Lys cassé — André MelançonThe Secret — Leuten RojasSeductio — Bashar ShbibSo Many Miracles — Saul RubinekTaking Care — Clarke MackeyTo Hurt and to Heal — Laura SkyTrain of Dreams — John N. SmithToo Outrageous! — Richard BennerUndivided Attention — Chris GallagherA Winter Tan — Jackie Burroughs, Louise Clark, John Frizzell, John Walker and Aerlyn WeissmanWorld Dreams — Niv Fichman

DocumentariesAqabat-Jaber, Passing Through by Eyal SivanArtist on Fire by Kay ArmatageBroken Noses by Bruce WeberCall Me Madame (Appelez-moi Madame) by Françoise RomandChuck Solomon: Coming of Age by Marc HuestisDancing Around the Table by Maurice BulbulianDistant Harmony by Dewitt L. SageThe Finest Kind by Mary Jane GomesFrom the Pole to the Equator by Yervant GianikianGap-Toothed Women by Les BlankGreenham Granny by Caroline GoldieHandsworth Songs by John AkomfrahThe Houses Are Full of Smoke by Allan FrancovichHuey Lewis and the News: Be-Fore! by Les BlankIn the Name of God (En nombre de Dios) by Patricio GuzmánInternational Sweethearts of Rhythm by Greta SchillerIt Is Not Easy to be Young by Y. PodnieksJoe Polowsky: An American Dreamer by Wolfgang PfeifferResan (The Journey) by Peter WatkinsKamikaze Hearts by Juliet BashoreLandslides by Sarah GibsonPoundmaker's Lodge by Alanis ObomsawinRobert Wilson and the Civil Wars by Howard BrooknerThose Roos Boys and Friends by Barbara BoydenSigned, Lino Brocka by Christian BlackwoodVincent by Paul CoxWeapons of the Spirit by Pierre SauvageWhere Is Here? by Sturla GunnarssonWild Flowers: Women of South Lebanon by Mai MasriZiveli: Medicine for the Heart by Les BlankThe Zoo by Kevin McMahon

Buried TreasuresAlone Across the Pacific — Kon Ichikawa (1963) The Girl Friends (Le Amiche) — Michelangelo Antonioni (1955) Hullabaloo Over Georgie and Bonnie's Pictures — James Ivory (1979) Kanchenjunga — Satyajit Ray (1962) King Lear — Grigori Kozintsev (1971)A New Leaf — Elaine May (1971) Rendezvous at Bray (Rendez-vous à Bray) — André Delvaux (1971)The Spy in Black — Michael Powell (1939)Went the Day Well?'' — Alberto Cavalcanti (1942)

References

External links
 Official site
 TIFF: A Reel History: 1976 - 2012
1987 Toronto International Film Festival at IMDb

1987
1987 film festivals
1987 in Toronto
1987 in Canadian cinema